The Brian McCarthy Memorial Moosehead Award is a grant issued to Australian comedians wishing to premiere new works as part of the Melbourne International Comedy Festival. It is named after Brian McCarthy, a young comedian and comedy producer killed in a car accident in 1987.

Each year benefit performances are held in Melbourne (as part of the Comedy Festival) and Sydney, and the money raised is used to produce new shows by successful applicants, who are thus free to try out a new and exciting idea without worrying whether it will be "commercially viable". The Award is substantial, but rather than providing funds directly, the Moosehead association produces the show, organising everything from Festival registration to venue and equipment hire and marketing. It also provides access to professional photographers, publicists, directors and other resources typically too expensive for comedians.

The award is known as the "Moosehead" award as Moosehead beer was Brian McCarthy's favorite.  His favorite song, I Heard It Through the Grapevine, is traditionally performed by the closing act of every Moosehead Award benefit show.

In recent years the Award has also received  sponsorship from The Comedy Channel.

List of Award recipients 
 1994 - Stef Torok & Brad Oakes - Telephoney Meen
 1995 - Andrew Goodone - He, Comedian
 1996 - Tim Harris  - An Illustrated Lecture by Dr Alexander Buchanan; The Rhonda Movement - Dumhead; Denise Scott - Life of the Party
 1997 - Jim Lawson & Trevor Major - Bega Than Cheesus; Miss Itchy - I Can't Stop Burrowing;  Alan Brough - Generation XXL
 1998 - Crazy E - The Madness Tour; Adam Richard - Tragedy; Meshel Laurie - The Virgin Mary 2 - This Time It's Personal
 1999 - Tim Harris - The Neville Chamberlin show; Corinne Grant - Waiting for Munro; The 4 Noels - The Magnificent Seventeen
 2000 - Damian Callinan & Lawrence Mooney - Out and About; Gerard McCulloch - An Englishman An Irishman and a Sootsman Walk Into a Documentary; Emotional People - Rockothello
 2001 - Kim Hope - Sing Your Arse Off; Stephen Hall & Michael Ward - I Said, I Said
 2002 - Claire Bartholomew - One Man's Business; Scott Brennan - Glen Bush Teenage Superstar; Barfoot & Cantone
 2003 - Sam Simmons - The Steve Promise Story; John Knowles - Saddle Sore; Fiona Harris and Katrina Mathers - Footy Chicks
 2004 - Damian Clark - The Bandit; Krisztian Bagin - The Beginning and End of Fin Begin; Monica Dullard's Concert After Tea
 2005 - Gavin Baskerville - As Seen on TV; Rebecca De Unamuno - Open to Suggestion; Tanya Losanno - Trophy Wife
 2006 - Richard McKenzie - Digger; Penny Tangey - Kathy Smith Goes to Maths Camp; Damian Callinan - Spazznuts
 2007 - Justin Hamilton in Three Colours Hammo; Alison Bice in The Wizard of Bice; Amelia Jane Hunter is Keith Flipp (The Girl from Belkendowns Flat)
 2008 - Sammy J in the Forest of Dreams (with Heath McIvor); The Axis of Awesome Comeback Spectacular!; Meat the Musical (Hannah Gadsby and Amelia Jane Hunter); Allsopp & Henderson‘s The Jinglists
 2009 - Asher Treleaven - Open Door; Wes Snelling in Kiosk; Dave Bloustien - The Social Contract; Lou Sanz - Who Is Priscilla Irving? 
 2010 - Adrian Calear - Code Grey; Sam Simmons & David Quirk - The Incident; Steve Sheehan - Stevl Shefn and His Translator Fatima

See also 
 List of Australian comedians
 Melbourne International Comedy Festival

References

External links 
 The Brian McCarthy Memorial Moosehead Awards - official site at Token Artists.

Australian comedy awards